Kareem Lamar Rush (born October 30, 1980) is an American former professional basketball player. Rush's younger brother, Brandon, last played for the Minnesota Timberwolves, while older brother JaRon played college basketball for UCLA.

College career
After graduating from Pembroke Hill School in Kansas City, Rush attended the University of Missouri in Columbia, Missouri, where he was a standout guard on the basketball team. Rush averaged 19.8 points per game as a junior, leading the Tigers to the Western Regional finals in the NCAA tournament, where they lost to Oklahoma. As a sophomore in 2000–01, he led the Big 12 in scoring, averaging 21.1 points per game. During this time, Rush worked with world-renowned conditioning coach Istvan Javorek.

Professional career

Los Angeles Lakers (2002–2004)
Rush entered the 2002 NBA draft after his junior season and was selected with the 20th pick overall by the Toronto Raptors, who immediately traded his rights to the Los Angeles Lakers. Rush was projected to be a top 10 pick, but much like what happened to Kareem's elder brother JaRon—a former UCLA star—Kareem slipped down much further than anticipated. At the 2000 draft, JaRon, who left the Bruins after his sophomore season, was not selected. "No one wants to see something like that happen to his brother", JaRon said, weeping. "I mean, I knew he was going to get drafted eventually, but it was still hard."

Over his first two seasons, he played a limited, back-up role on the Shaquille O'Neal and Kobe Bryant-led club. However, due to his three-point shooting accuracy, he would become a more frequently used reserve player in the 2003–2004 playoffs for coach Phil Jackson. Although the Lakers would lose to the Pistons in the NBA Finals, Rush was able to make somewhat of a name for himself as a sharpshooter, averaging 14 minutes per game and hitting 40% of his three-point shots in the playoffs. He was a major contributor in helping the Lakers clinch the Western Conference Finals against Kevin Garnett and the Minnesota Timberwolves, when he scored 18 points in the sixth and final game, all from 3-point range, where he was 6 for 7.

Charlotte Bobcats (2004–2006)
Fourteen games into the 2004–05 season, the Lakers traded Rush to the Charlotte Bobcats for two future second-round draft picks. In Charlotte, Rush found a larger role, often starting and averaging more than 25 minutes and 11.5 points per game. He set a then-Bobcats franchise record by scoring 35 points against the Indiana Pacers. His season ended March 2 when he strained his MCL during a game in New Orleans.

Seattle SuperSonics (2006)
During the 2006–07 offseason, Rush signed with the Seattle SuperSonics, but recovered slowly from a groin injury. In November 2006, the club waived him to make room for a replacement for two frontcourt players who had sustained injuries.

Lithuania (2006–2007)
Rush spent the next season playing in Lithuania. On December 21, 2006, he signed with ULEB Cup participant Lietuvos rytas from Vilnius. He was chosen by the Slovenian coach Zmago Sagadin and led his team to the cup final. On February 24, 2007, Rush was named the MVP of the 2007 LKL All-Star Game. On April 21, Rush's team became the champion of the Baltic Basketball League; he was named the Final Four MVP.

Indiana Pacers (2007–2008)
On July 3, 2007, Rush signed with the Indiana Pacers, who cited their need for a shooter.

Philadelphia 76ers (2008–2009)
On July 28, 2008, Rush signed a deal with the Philadelphia 76ers.

Los Angeles Clippers (2009–2010)
Rush eventually signed for the Los Angeles Clippers, because of injuries to other players on the roster. However, Rush himself suffered an ACL tear in his right knee on November 18, 2009. The day before his ACL tear would end up being his final NBA game ever. On November 17, 2009 the Clippers would lose to the New Orleans Hornets 102 - 110 with Rush only playing for less than 2 minutes and recording no stats.

Rush was waived by the Clippers on January 22, 2010.

Los Angeles D-Fenders (2012)
On March 12, 2012, Los Angeles D-Fenders of the NBA D-League acquired Rush.

Los Angeles Slam (2012–2013)
For the 2012–13 season, Rush played for the Los Angeles Slam of the ABA.

Los Angeles D-Fenders (2013–2014)
In November 2013, he was re-acquired by the Los Angeles D-Fenders.

On January 22, 2014, Rush left the D-Fenders, citing his desire to formally retire from basketball.

BIG3 Basketball (2017)
In 2017, Rush joined the BIG3 basketball league, playing on a talent-stacked 3 Headed Monsters roster, highlighted by head coach (and NBA Hall of Famer) Gary Payton, as well as Kwame Brown (the first ever directly-from-high-school player to go #1 overall in the NBA Draft), Rashard Lewis, Jason Williams, and Mahmoud Abdul-Rauf.

North American Premier Basketball (2018–present)
In January 2018, he signed with the Kansas City Tornados of the first-year North American Premier Basketball.

NBA career statistics

Regular season 

|-
| align="left" | 
| align="left" | L.A. Lakers
| 76 || 0 || 11.5 || .393 || .279 || .696 || 1.2 || .9 || .1 || .1 || 3.0
|-
| align="left" | 
| align="left" | L.A. Lakers
| 72 || 15 || 17.3 || .440 || .348 || .596 || 1.3 || .8 || .5 || .3 || 6.4
|-
| align="left" | 
| align="left" | L.A. Lakers
| 14 || 0 || 6.5 || .200 || .200 || 1.000 || .7 || .2 || .1 || .1 || .9
|-
| align="left" | 
| align="left" | Charlotte
| 34 || 22 || 25.8 || .396 || .386 || .761 || 2.3 || 1.9 || .5 || .2 || 11.5
|-
| align="left" | 
| align="left" | Charlotte
| 47 || 25 || 23.6 || .386 || .348 || .714 || 2.2 || 1.1 || .8 || .3 || 10.1
|-
| align="left" | 
| align="left" | Indiana
| 71 || 15 || 21.2 || .401 || .389 || .714 || 2.4 || 1.3 || .6 || .3 || 8.3
|-
| align="left" | 
| align="left" | Philadelphia
| 25 || 1 || 8.0 || .345 || .303 || 1.000 || .6 || .6 || .2 || .0 || 2.2
|-
| align="left" | 
| align="left" | L.A. Clippers
| 7 || 0 || 8.3 || .364 || .333 || .000 || .9 || .6 || .3 || .4 || 1.3
|- class="sortbottom"
| style="text-align:center;" colspan="2"| Career
| 346 || 78 || 17.2 || .400 || .358 || .703 || 1.7 || 1.0 || .4 || .2 || 6.4

Playoffs 

|-
| align="left" | 2003
| align="left" | L.A. Lakers
| 9 || 0 || 7.1 || .379 || .364 || 1.000 || .3 || .2 || .1 || .0 || 3.3
|-
| align="left" | 2004
| align="left" | L.A. Lakers
| 22 || 0 || 14.3 || .385 || .400 || .667 || .7 || .8 || .5 || .1 || 3.7
|- class="sortbottom"
| style="text-align:center;" colspan="2"| Career
| 31 || 0 || 12.2 || .383 || .393 || .857 || .6 || .6 || .4 || .1 || 3.6

Personal life
Rush's younger brother Brandon also played in the NBA.

In 2010, Rush embarked on an R&B singing career, releasing his debut single "Hold You Down".

References

External links

Missouri Tigers bio

1980 births
Living people
African-American basketball players
American expatriate basketball people in Lithuania
American men's basketball players
American Ninja Warrior contestants
Basketball players from Kansas City, Missouri
BC Rytas players
Big3 players
Charlotte Bobcats players
Indiana Pacers players
Kansas City Tornadoes players
Los Angeles Clippers players
Los Angeles D-Fenders players
Los Angeles Lakers players
Missouri Tigers men's basketball players
Parade High School All-Americans (boys' basketball)
Philadelphia 76ers players
Shooting guards
Toronto Raptors draft picks
21st-century African-American sportspeople
20th-century African-American people
American men's 3x3 basketball players